Alpenus dollmani is a moth of the family Erebidae. It was described by George Hampson in 1920. It is found in Zambia and Zaire.

References

Moths described in 1920
Spilosomina
Moths of Africa
Insects of Zambia